Peter John Pike (b 1953) is a retired Anglican priest: he was Archdeacon of Montgomery, 2012–2018)

Pike was educated at the University of Southampton and ordained 1985. After a curacy in Broughton he held incumbencies at Woodplumpton, Briercliffe, Bempton and Berriew.

References

Living people
Alumni of the University of Southampton
21st-century Welsh Anglican priests
20th-century Welsh Anglican priests
Archdeacons of Montgomery
Alumni of Sarum College
1953 births